Itsari (Icari) is a language in the Dargin dialect continuum spoken in Dagestan, Russia spoken in the village Itsari by about 2,000 people. It is often considered a divergent dialect of Dargwa. Ethnologue lists it as a dialect of Dargwa but recognizes that it may be a separate language.

References

Further reading
Sumbatova, N. R., & Mutalov, R. O. (2003). Languages of the World/Materials 92: Icari. Lincom GmbH. 

Northeast Caucasian languages